This is a list of all cricketers who have captained Ireland in an official international match.  This includes the ICC Trophy, Under-19 games and One Day Internationals, Twenty20 Internationals. The tables are correct as of the February 2012.

Men's cricket

Test match captains
This is a list of cricketers who have captained the Ireland cricket team for at least one Test match.

A cricketer who has a symbol of  next to a Test match series describes their role as captain and their participation in at least one game for the team.

One Day International captains
In 2006, all-rounder Trent Johnston became Ireland's first ODI captain. He stepped down as captain in early 2008 and took a break from cricket as he was struggling with injury problems. William Porterfield succeeded Johnston as Ireland's full-time captain in April 2008. On occasions when Porterfield had been unavailable, sometimes due to commitments with his county side, Kyle McCallan had filled the role of captain. 
The table of results is complete up to the third and final match against Zimbabwe in September 2021.

Twenty20 International captains
This is a list of cricketers who have captained the Ireland cricket team for at least one Twenty20 International.The table of results is complete up to the ICC T-20 World cup match against Namibia in October 2021.

ICC Trophy/ICC World Cup Qualifier

Ireland debuted in the ICC Trophy in the 1993/94 tournament.

Women's cricket

Test match captains

Ireland had played one Test in 2000 against Pakistan at Dublin.

Women's One Day International captains

Women's Twenty20 International captains

Youth cricket

Youth One-Day International captains

Notes 
Percentage is worked out by counting tied games as half a win and excluding no results from the equation.

References

External links 
 Cricinfo
 Ireland's ICC Trophy captains at Cricket Archive 
 Ireland's Under-19's captains at Cricket Archive 

 
Captains
Ireland